"A Matter of Minutes" is the third segment of the fifteenth episode from the first season (1985–86) of the television series The Twilight Zone. This segment is based on Theodore Sturgeon's short story "Yesterday Was Monday", first published in June 1941. It follows a couple who accidentally discover that every minute of time actually takes place in a different location, each carefully crafted to maintain the illusion of continuity.

Plot
The Wrights, a young married couple, wake up on April 27, 1986 to the sounds of construction. When they investigate they find a crew of blue-clad construction workers are removing the furniture in their house and the telephone doesn't work. The Wrights run outside to find things being rebuilt all over the neighborhood - things that have already existed.

Confused and frightened, the couple run into a back alley and enter a void of white space. A man in yellow calls them back and explains to them that he is the supervisor of the maintenance of time. The Wrights should be at 9:33 a.m., but by some means have hopped over into 11:37 a.m. He reveals that every minute is a separate world which must be carefully built ahead of time to ensure that, for example, the house someone is living in at 3:02 appears to be the same one they were living in at 3:01. There are places that no one will go to or see during certain minutes, so they don't bother building anything in those places, resulting in the voids of white space.

The supervisor informs them that they cannot return to the present, in order to keep the true nature of time a secret. The Wrights flee from the foreman and his crew, hide inside a theater ticket booth, and wait until 11:37 a.m. rolls around, when their location will become the present. The foreman finds them too late, as the rest of humanity must now be shifted into the 11:37 world, and if he is still there when they arrive, the secret of time will be exposed. Back in the normal flow of time, the Wrights plan to tell their friend, a science fiction writer, about their experience, after finding a blue wrench--proof of their experience.

See also
 The Twilight Zone
 The Langoliers, involving traveling into the past to find it ready to be destroyed

External links
 

The Twilight Zone (1985 TV series season 1) episodes
1986 American television episodes
Fiction set in 1986
Television shows based on short fiction

fr:Les Coulisses du temps